The Edge class is a class of cruise ships operated by Celebrity Cruises, a subsidiary of Royal Caribbean Cruises Ltd. The class is constructed by Chantiers de l'Atlantique of France. Celebrity Apex was scheduled to begin operations in April 2020, but entry into service was delayed due to the COVID-19 pandemic. Her inaugural sailing was on June 21, 2021. A Fourth ship is currently under construction. Celebrity Ascent is tentatively debuting 4th Quarter 2023.

Both Celebrity Edge and Celebrity Apex are built with a gross tonnage (GT) of 130,818. Ships in this class are reported to cost US$1 billion each.

History

Orders 
On 4 December 2014, Royal Caribbean Cruises Ltd. announced that it had signed a letter of intent with STX France for two new ships that would compose a new class of vessels for the Celebrity Cruises fleet. In June 2015, the letter was converted into a formal order for the first two ships.

On 25 May 2016, Royal Caribbean Cruises Ltd. announced that it had signed a memorandum of understanding with STX France for two additional ships for the Edge class. These two vessels comprise the third and fourth in the class, scheduled for delivery in fall 2021 and 2022, respectively.

On 11 April 2019, Royal Caribbean Cruises Ltd. ordered a fifth Edge-class ship with Chantiers de l'Atlantique, with delivery scheduled for fall 2024.

Construction 
Celebrity Cruises marked the beginning of construction for the first Edge-class vessel with the steel-cutting ceremony on 21 November 2016 at the STX France shipyard. On the same day, the lead vessel's name was announced as Celebrity Edge. She was delivered on 31 October 2018.

Celebrity initially named the second vessel of the Edge class as Celebrity Beyond, but she was renamed Celebrity Apex on the day of her steel-cutting on 23 July 2018. She was delivered on 27 March 2020.

Celebrity celebrated the steel-cutting of the third ship, named Celebrity Beyond, on 28 January 2020. She is the first of three vessels in the class to evolve in design and expand in gross tonnage. She entered into service on April 27, 2022 with a sailing from Southampton, UK.

Celebrity's fourth Edge Class vessel, Celebrity Ascent, steel-cutting occurred on 17 November 2021. The ship is expected to join the fleet in late 2023.

Ships

References

Cruise ship classes
Ships of Celebrity Cruises